Noemi Tesorero (December 29, 1974 – August 31, 2021), known professionally as Mahal, was a Filipino actress, comedian and vlogger. She had dwarfism, but was noted for her childlike roles and giggly personality.

Career 
Mahal was discovered when a newspaper article featured her and a policeman comparing her size to an ArmaLite assault rifle. She then went on to be featured by Inday Badiday in her talk show Eye to Eye, before appearing regularly on television in 1988 through the noontime show Lunch Date. Living with dwarfism, standing three feet tall, she was candid with her self-deprecating humor and embraced roles using her height to comic effect, or to fulfill demands of fantasy characters.

Mahal played the role of the elfin daughter in the 1991 film Anak ni Janice In the 2003 film Mr. Suave, Mahal along with Dagul, who also has dwarfism, took the role of parents of Vhong Navarro's character. She later starred in several TV shows, including Idol Ko si Kap and Bahay Mo Ba 'To?.

Mahal also ventured into singing with Allan Padua, better known as Mura, who also has dwarfism, with whom she formed a tandem in Magandang Tanghali Bayan.

From being a simple and naïve comedienne, Mahal changed her image as a daring and liberated woman in 2013. She had a tattoo and wore sexy outfits in TV guest appearances. She also answered interviews with sexual innuendos and was not shy to reveal her age. Mahal also started to accept sexy projects, like the indie film Gigolo.

In an episode of Face the People, Mahal lamented about the mismanagement of Jethro Carrey, her manager, towards her career, and the alleged favoritism of the latter over his other newer talents.

She also guested in an episode of Dear Uge with Pokwang. Mahal also had some gigs at comedy bars in Manila. She started a YouTube channel in July 2020, where she regularly posted vlogs with actor and YouTuber Mygz Molino. The channel garnered 500,000 subscribers at the time of her death in August 2021.

Mahal featured in the 2021 television series Owe My Love. Due to the risk of COVID-19, her taping with Owe My Love was cut short.

Weeks prior to her death in August 2021, Mahal received public attention for her reunion with Mura. One of her latest vlogs showed a behind-the-scenes of her last TV appearance on Kapuso Mo, Jessica Soho, where she visited Mura in Guinobatan, Albay. Apart from visiting, Mahal provided some words of encouragement to Mura, along with some groceries and cash.

Love life and rumored romances 
Mahal became the subject of controversy involving her romantic life. She was known for being in a relationship with singer Jimboy Salazar, who died in 2015, and aspiring actor Aries Navarro. She named Salazar as the most "plastic" person she met in showbiz. She did not comment any further about Salazar when he decided to marry his boyfriend in March 2015 after coming out as gay. At that time, Mahal was in a relationship with Jimmy Navarro, a widower.

On November 2, 2015, Mahal married Jobbie Hebrio, a butcher and merchandiser in a supermarket, at the Quezon City Hall. The marriage was witnessed by singers Mae Rivera and Kissa Kurdi, both close friends of Mahal, and city councilor Victor Ferrer, whose farm in Quezon City was where the wedding reception took place. Aries Navarro, not related to Jimmy, was not happy with the news when he heard about Mahal's marriage with Hebrio. He said Mahal fooled and cheated on him and that they were still together when Mahal secretly saw Hebrio. He also said that he often saw Mahal hiding from him when she was on the phone. Mahal said that she was happily in love with her new husband and she asked Aries Navarro to leave her alone, to move on and be happy for her. She also said that she felt used by Aries Navarro. Aries Navarro said that he was happy for Mahal and that he had no other choice. However, after two years of being together, Mahal and Hebrio decided to split up.

Mahal said she was afraid to fall in love again due to her previous relationship with Hebrio and instead decided to prioritize helping her family. However, in 2017, Mahal was rumored to have a new boyfriend, Sam Jacinto. But Jacinto clarified that they were just friends and asked the public to stop judging their relationship because Mahal was still married. She also candidly disclosed that she had a crush on her Owe My Love co-star Joaquin Manansala. However, she maintained her professionalism at work.

Mahal lived in Tanauan with Mygz Molino, an indie film actor. She had already lived with him in Marikina City, and after the taping of Owe My Love, Molino decided to live in his hometown Tanauan with Mahal. But before Molino decided to bring Mahal with him, he asked the permission of her mother and siblings. However, some unknown relative did not approve of Mahal and Molino's tandem, accusing Molino of using Mahal for the vlog views to generate income. Mahal defended her decision to be with Molino. Mahal and Molino had first met in a show in Abra in 2010.

Ai-Ai delas Alas is impressed by Molino's unconditional and genuine love of Mahal. Previously, Mahal was rumored to be interested in Jed Salang, the former husband of delas Alas.

Scandal 
During an appearance on the morning radio program Good Times in 2007, Mahal admitted to spreading a scandalous video a few years earlier.

Personal life 
Mahal was the daughter of Romy Tesorero and her stepmother Josefa. Her grandmother gave her the nickname "Mahal", which later became her stage name in her career. She has a sister based in the United States who owns a restaurant in Cleveland and a brother who is a policeman stationed in Palawan. Her family is well-off and she was not required to work. However, Mahal insisted on working instead.

In an episode of Tunay na Buhay, Mahal shared her motto, which was to keep on smiling despite the problems life throws at you.

Death 
On August 31, 2021, Mahal died in a hospital in Batangas. According to her sister Irene Tesorero, she died due to gastroenteritis and COVID-19. She had pre-existing conditions, including hypertension. Because of dwarfism, she was considered to be at high risk for COVID-19.

Rosanna Roces, Inday Garutay, Brenda Mage, and Jerald Napoles were among the first celebrities to mourn for Mahal. Owe My Love co-stars and close friends Ai-Ai Delas Alas  and Kiray Celis were surprised to know of the sudden demise of Mahal. Netizens and other celebrities took to social media to express their grief. When Mura found out about her death, he was in disbelief at first and dismissed the reports as fake news. Mahal and Mura were former on-screen tandem for almost two decades.

The siblings of Mahal dismissed the rumors that they are blaming Mygz Molino and her manager for her death. Instead, they were even thankful for their efforts exerted to revive Mahal until the very end.

Her remains were cremated in Batangas. After her cremation, her family brought her urn to the Santuario de San Vicente de Paul Shrine in Quezon City.

Filmography

Film

Television

Discography

References

External links 
 

1974 births
2021 deaths
ABS-CBN personalities
Actors with dwarfism
Bicolano people
Deaths from the COVID-19 pandemic in the Philippines
Filipino child actresses
Filipino film actresses
Filipino people with disabilities
Filipino television personalities
Filipino women comedians
Filipino YouTubers
GMA Network personalities
People from Catanduanes
Entertainers with dwarfism
TV5 (Philippine TV network) personalities
20th-century Filipino actresses
21st-century Filipino actresses
Filipino television actresses
21st-century Filipino women singers